Spavinaw is a town in Mayes County, Oklahoma, United States. The population was 437 at the 2010 census, a decline of 22.4 percent from the figure of 563 recorded in 2000. The town is best known as the birthplace of baseball player Mickey Mantle. It is also notable for the nearby Lake Spavinaw, the principal source of water for Tulsa.

History
The town is named for Spavinaw Creek, a stream named by French traders and explorers who travelled here in the 18th century. According to historian Muriel Wright, the French name was a corrupted form of the French word ce'pee (meaning "young growth or shoots of wood"). plus the French adjective vineux (wine colored). This term referred to a description of the color of black jack, post and red oak trees which grow here in springtime.

The first recorded settler here was Lewis Rogers, son of Captain John Rogers. Lewis set up a mill, a distillery and a salt works in 1829. In 1839, the Eastern Cherokee began moving into the Spavinaw area of Indian Territory. The Cherokee council outlawed the operation of distilleries in their area and dispossessed Rogers of his distillery and the salt works, both of which had already been damaged by a flooding of Spavinaw Creek.

In 1846, Jacob Croft, a Mormon en route to Utah, decided to settle here instead. He was hired by Joseph Lynch Martin to restore the mill. In 1855, a group of Mormon missionaries from Utah arrived at Croft's home and began converting Cherokees and Creeks. When they began urging the converts to move to Utah, Lewis Rogers complained to the Cherokee council. In October 1856, Chief John Ross ordered all Mormons out of the Cherokee nation.

After the Civil War, Joseph "Greenbrier Joe" Lynch, brother-in-law of Joseph Lynch Martin, began operating the mill and the salt works. Greenbrier Joe had saved enough money to buy . The community that grew up around these works became known as Lynch's Mill. In October 1878, the community was renamed Spavinaw Mills.

Lake Spavinaw

After the city of Tulsa began the Spavinaw Water Project in the 1920s, construction began on the Spavinaw Dam, which created Lake Spavinaw from Spavinaw Creek. The project submerged the site of the former Spavinaw Mills. The residents moved a short distance to found a new town called Spavinaw.

Geography
Spavinaw is located at  (36.392585, -95.048665).

The town is also host to Lake Spavinaw, the main water supplier of The City of Tulsa.

Demographics

At the 2010 census Spavinaw had a population of 437.  The racial and ethnic composition of the population was 59.3% non-Hispanic, white 27.9%, non-Hispanic Native American 2.1%, Hispanic Native American, 9.2% reporting two or more races and 4.3% Hispanic or Latino of any race.

As of the census of 2000, there were 563 people, 215 households, and 141 families residing in the town. There were 290 housing units at an average density of 747.3 per square mile (287.1/km2). The racial makeup of the town was 63.06% White, 26.11% Native American, 0.53% from other races, and 10.30% from two or more races. Hispanic or Latino of any race were 3.73% of the population.

There were 215 households, out of which 30.7% had children under the age of 18 living with them, 44.7% were married couples living together, 15.8% had a female householder with no husband present, and 34.0% were non-families. 29.3% of all households were made up of individuals, and 15.3% had someone living alone who was 65 years of age or older.  The average household size was 2.62 and the average family size was 3.24.

In the town, the population was spread out, with 30.0% under the age of 18, 8.9% from 18 to 24, 25.0% from 25 to 44, 21.1% from 45 to 64, and 14.9% who were 65 years of age or older.  The median age was 34 years. For every 100 females, there were 95.5 males.  For every 100 females age 18 and over, there were 87.6 males.

The median income for a household in the town was $19,792, and the median income for a family was $22,188. Males had a median income of $24,028 versus $17,750 for females. The per capita income for the town was $11,010.  About 28.7% of families and 27.7% of the population were below the poverty line, including 38.2% of those under the age of 18 and 13.8% of those 65 and older.

Notable person

 Mickey Mantle, (1931–1995), was a professional baseball player. Mantle played his entire Major League Baseball (MLB) career (1951–1968) with the New York Yankees.

See also
Oklahoma Historical Society. Chronicles of Oklahoma."Lynch's Mill was Spavinaw's Name in Early History." September 1927. Electronic version accessed January 18, 2011.

References

Towns in Mayes County, Oklahoma
Towns in Oklahoma